Syllitus heros is a species of beetle in the family Cerambycidae. It was described by Blackburn in 1900.

References

Stenoderini
Beetles described in 1900